The 2019 Vaahteraliiga season was the 40th season of the highest level of American football in Finland. The regular season took place between May 23 and August 31, 2019. Like in the last two seasons, the Helsinki Roosters finished the regular season as top ranked team. In the play-offs, the Roosters and the Kuopio Steelers qualified for the championship game Vaahteramalja LX. Contrary to the regular season, where the Steelers defeated the Roosters in both matches, the Roosters won the final quite clearly. It was the 8th consecutive championship and the 22nd total championship for the Roosters.

Standings

Playoffs

References

American football in Finland
Vaahteraliiga
Vaahteraliiga